CGS Aberdeen was a Canadian Government Ship launched in 1894, which served as a lighthouse supply and buoy vessel. The vessel served on the East Coast of Canada until 1923, when the vessel ran aground on Seal Island, Nova Scotia.

Description
Originally flush-decked and able to set fore and aft sail, she was later rebuilt with a high forecastle and a heavy derrick forward.

Service history
Aberdeen was ordered in 1893 from Fleming & Ferguson and constructed at their yard in Paisley, Scotland. The ship was launched on 19 June 1894 and completed in August of that year. The ship was named for the Earl of Aberdeen, the Governor General of Canada at the time. Entering service in 1894, Aberdeen was initially deployed as a lighthouse supply and buoy vessel along the Atlantic coast of Canada. The vessel was later transferred to Quebec before returning to the Atlantic coast in 1904 when the vessel was assigned to Saint John, New Brunswick.

Loss
On 13 October 1923, Aberdeen sailed from Yarmouth in thick fog on an inspection tour. She carried a crew of forty-five men under the command of Captain Loran A. Kenney. The collision ripped a  hole in her side. The ship filled and settled on the ledge within 15 minutes.

The ship had about 500 bags of cement destined for the Cape Sable Light aboard, and also drums of calcium carbide, that caused much concern (as it reacts with water to form the flammable gas acetylene). About 25 of the crew were sent to the Seal Island Light Station in the ship's boats, while the remainder stayed aboard to assist in salvaging as much of the wreck as they could.

References

1894 ships
Ships built on the River Clyde
Navaids tenders of the Canadian Coast Guard
Shipwrecks of the Nova Scotia coast
Steamships of Canada
Canadian Government Ship